Haitang Subdistrict is a subdistrict in Luyang District of Anhui, China. , it administers the following five residential communities: 
Outang Community
Qinghua Community
Hetang Community
Pinglou Community
Jianhua Community

See also 
 List of township-level divisions of Anhui

References 

Township-level divisions of Anhui
Hefei